Sihawu Dlamini (born 12 June 1985) is a Swaziland international footballer who plays as a defender. As of January 2010, he plays for Royal Leopards in the Swazi Premier League and has won 11 caps for his country.

External links

1985 births
Living people
Swazi footballers
Eswatini international footballers
Royal Leopards F.C. players
Association football defenders